Walter M. Yust (May 16, 1894 – February 29, 1960) was an American journalist and writer. Yust was the American editor-in-chief of the Encyclopædia Britannica from 1938 to 1960.

Early life
Yust was a graduate of the University of Pennsylvania.

Career
Yust began his career as a writer for the Philadelphia Evening Ledger in 1917 and later worked for newspapers in New Orleans, Louisiana, and for other publications.  Yust became the literary editor of the Philadelphia Public Ledger in 1926. Three years later, upon writing a review of the new 14th edition of the Encyclopædia Britannica, Yust came to the attention of its president, William Cox. The following year Yust began to work for the encyclopaedia and became its associate editor in 1932. He served as editor in chief from 1938 until his retirement in 1960.

Personal life
He was the father of Jane Yust Rivera and filmmaker Larry Yust, who made a 20-minute film, in 1969, for Encyclopædia Britannica Films, of Shirley Jacksons "The Lottery", later, Trick Baby (1972), and Homebodies (1974).

References

Works

1894 births
1960 deaths
Encyclopædia Britannica
Writers from Philadelphia
Print editors
20th-century American male writers